Founded in 1999 as a not-for-profit 501(c)(3) organization, the Virginia Institute of Forensic Science and Medicine is a provider of education, training, and research. The Institute's purpose is to strengthen and improve the administration of justice by educating forensic scientists, forensic pathologists, law enforcement, legal professionals, medical professionals, and the public. The institute was founded with a grant from novelist Patricia Cornwell, creator of the fictional medical examiner Kay Scarpetta.

The Virginia Institute of Forensic Science and Medicine has a medical examiner system, forensic science laboratories, and more than 200 faculty members who are practitioners of forensic science and medicine.

The Virginia Institute of Forensic Science and Medicine offers post-graduate fellowships as preparation for careers in forensic disciplines.

In 2006, the Virginia Institute of Forensic Science and Medicine claimed to accomplish the following:
It was presented with the 2006 Associations Advance America Award of Excellence in Public Policy in Washington, D.C.
It was the featured presenter at the 2006 Virginia Bioscience Conference. 
It was the nominee for the 2006 Harvard University Innovations in American Government Award. 
The American film company M2 Productions produced a feature-length documentary about VIFSM's Fellowship Training program.

External links
The Virginia Institute of Forensic Science and Medicine

Organizations based in Virginia
Forensics organizations
Organizations established in 1999
1999 establishments in Virginia